Lecidea griseomarginata is a species of lichen in the family Lecideaceae. Found in Alaska, it was described as a new species in 2020 by lichenologist Alan Fryday. The type specimen was collected in the Hoonah-Angoon Census Area of Glacier Bay National Park, where it was found growing on a granitic rock along the shoreline of Ptarmigan Creek. It is only known to occur at the type locality. The specific epithet griseomarginata refers to the gray proper margin of the apothecia.

See also
List of Lecidea species

References

Lecideales
Lichen species
Lichens described in 2020
Lichens of Subarctic America
Fungi without expected TNC conservation status